The Korgfjell Tunnel is an  long road tunnel in Nordland county, Norway.  The tunnel connects Knutli in Vefsn Municipality with the village of Korgen in Hemnes Municipality. Work on the tunnel started in September 2001 and it was opened on 16 September 2005.

The travel time was shortened by 10–20 minutes. Before the tunnel, trucks with trailers were often stuck going uphill or downhill in snowy conditions, blocking the road. The place was considered one of the worst places on the E6 highway. The mountain road which reaches  in altitude was built by the Germans during World War II, replacing a ferry connection at Elsfjord.

Gallery

References

Road tunnels in Nordland
2005 establishments in Norway
European route E6 in Norway
Tunnels completed in 2005
Vefsn
Hemnes